Catharina Jacoba Hendrika Dubbelday Haynes (born November 9, 1963) is a United States circuit judge of the United States Court of Appeals for the Fifth Circuit.

Background
Haynes was born in Melbourne, Florida and graduated from Satellite High School, Satellite Beach, Florida in 1980 . She received a Bachelor of Science degree in Psychology  from the Florida Institute of Technology in 1983 at the age of 19. She graduated second in her class from Emory University School of Law in 1986 with her Juris Doctor at the age of 22. While at Emory, she was an editor for the Emory Law Journal. She became a member of the State Bar of Texas in 1986.

After law school, Haynes was in private practice in Texas from 1986 to 1998 with the firms of Thompson & Knight, as an associate from 1986 to 1988 and then Baker Botts, as an associate from 1988 to 1995, and then became a partner in 1995. 

In 1998, Haynes was elected to the 191st District Court in Dallas, Texas. She was re-elected in 2002. As a state district court judge, she presided over jury and bench trials involving civil litigation. After losing re-election in 2006, she returned to Baker Botts as a partner, where she practiced complex business litigation and maintained an appellate and Supreme Court practice.

Federal judicial service
On the recommendation of Senators John Cornyn and Kay Bailey Hutchison, Haynes was nominated on July 17, 2007 by President George W. Bush to fill a vacancy on the Fifth Circuit created by Judge Harold R. DeMoss Jr., who assumed senior status on July 1, 2007. Haynes received a hearing before the Senate Judiciary Committee on February 21, 2008, and was voted out of committee on April 3, 2008. She was confirmed by the United States Senate by unanimous consent on April 10, 2008, just under nine months after her nomination. She received her commission on April 18, 2008. She maintains chambers in Dallas.

References

External links

White House Profile on Catharina Haynes
Department of Justice Resume of Haynes

1963 births
Living people
21st-century American judges
Emory University School of Law alumni
Florida Institute of Technology alumni
Judges of the United States Court of Appeals for the Fifth Circuit
People from Melbourne, Florida
Satellite High School alumni
Texas state court judges
United States court of appeals judges appointed by George W. Bush
Women in Texas politics
21st-century American women judges
People associated with Baker Botts